Mangalwedha is a town in the Solapur district in the Indian state of Maharashtra. It is the birthplace of Shri Jayatirtha, also called Teekacharya, one of the prominent saints of the Dvaita school of Vedanta.

Geography
The city of Mangalwedha is situated 55 km west of the district headquarters at Solapur and 25 km southeast of Pandharpur city.

Mangalwedha shares its boundaries with Pandharpur, Sangola, Mohol, Jath, and Bijapur in Karnataka.

There are so many villages in Mangalwedha Sub district. Khomnal is one of the near village.

History
Mangalwedha is also known as the "Land of Saints" as Saint Jayatirtha, Saint Damaji, Saint Kanhopatra, Saint Basaveshwera, and Saint Chokhamela are said to have come from Mangalwedha during the 14th century.

Mangalwedha is also known as Jwariche Kothar.

The major crops that are grown in and around Mangalwedha include Jowar, Bajra, groundnut, Sugarcane, and corn. Mangalwedha's Jowar and Bajra have received geographical indications (GI) tags.

In the 14th century, Mangalwedha was ruled by the Bidar Sultanate followed by the Bijapur Sultanate.

Huljanti village is known for the Mahalingaraya deity and Biroba deity and as well as having a large fair during Diwali. Many people from Maharashtra and Karnataka come there to worship their deities.

Khomnal village is known for the Kamsidhha deity and Maykka deity and as well as having a large fair during Gudi Padwa.kamsiddha deity temple is managed by Sudhir Pandurang Ingale-Patil.

Cuisine

Mangalwedha is the only location where you get Tasty and Budget friendly sweets and also known for its special cuisine of jowar bhakri and salsa made from coarsely ground green chilis, kharda/thecha, and onion and chutney of groundnuts. Bhaji (a fritter made from gram flour) and Laddu is another delicacy from Mangalwedha. It is also known for its spicy bhel, vada pav, Basundi and puri bhaji.

Demographics
As of the 2011 Census of India, Mangalwedha has a population of 21,824 consisting of 11,109 males and 10,715 females. There were 2,510 children ages 0–6.

Marathi is the official and most spoken language of Mangalwedha. The town also has Urdu and Kannada speaking minorities.

Villages
1)Akole
2)Gunjegaon
3)Marapur
4)Gharniki
5)Mallewadi
6)Dhavalas
7)Degaon
8)Salagar
9)Shelewadi
10)Laxami-Dahiwadi
11)Dharamgaon
12)Mudhavi
13)Uchethan
14)Bathan
15)Bramhapuri
16)Machanur
17)Tamdardi
18)Tandor
19)Siddapur
20)Borale
21)Rahatewadi
22)Mundhewadi
23)Lavangi
24)Kacharewadi
25)Dongargaon
26)Fatewadi
27)Hivargaon
28)Khomnal
29)Talsangi
30)Bhalewadi
31)Donaj
32)Arali
33)Nandur
34)Maravade
35)Diksal
36)Yedrav
37)Bhalwani
38)Jitti
39)Khave
40)Andhalgaon
41)Ganeshwadi
42)Patkhal
43)Khupsangi
44)Lendave-Chichale
45)Shirashi
46)Gonewadi
47)Junoni
48)Metkarwadi
49)Hajapur
50)Jalihal
51)Khadaki
52)Nandeshwar
53)Siddhankeri
54)Nimboni
55)Radde
56)Bhose
57)Manewadi
58)Hunnar
59)Shirnadgi
60)Chikhalgi
61)Maroli
62)Mahamadabad
63)Revewadi
64)Lonar
65)Padolkarwadi
66)Lamantanda
67)Kagasht
68)Katral
69)Karjal
70)Huljanti
71)Malewadi
72)Pout
73)Bavachi
74)Jangalgi
75)Yelagi
76)Soddi
77)Shivangi
78)Asabewadi

References

External links
 Mangalvedha on Solapur District Gazette
 Mangalwedha Live

Cities and towns in Solapur district
Talukas in Maharashtra